Açina, also Âššina, was one of the last kings of the kingdom of Elam, and ruled briefly in 522 BCE. He was toppled by Darius I and later depicted in chains in the Behistun Inscription.

According to Darius in his inscription:

See also
 List of rulers of Elam

References

Elamite kings
522 BC deaths
Year of birth unknown
Kings of the Neo-Elamite Period
6th-century BC executions